Munir Altheeb(born 1942) is a notable Syrian scholar, artist and historian critic in the history and art, Member of the Arab Writers Union and member of the Heritage Preservation Commission Hauran,  He contributed several books to a lot of Arab libraries in the Arab countries and contributed to many newspapers and magazines in Syria and the Arab Countries.

Early life
Munir was born in Khabab, in southern Syria.  He was the oldest boy in a family of three brothers and two daughters, born to a farmer's family in Khabab where he was educated in the primary schools and High School. He went on to study at the University of Damascus Faculty of Law (1958–1961). He became a teacher of art at the secondary level in 1965 when he finished High School . he Performed a number of art galleries and received.

Career
The Syrian government sent him to Yemen in 1981 for teaching and he start there prepared and directed curriculum, books, and mapping at all stages in the Ministry of Education of Yemen. Published at that time more than ninety articles in newspapers and magazines since 1982 related to the Yemeni history and the Yemeni Art. when his return to Syria continued teaching in his hometown Khabab and joined to the Arab Writers Union and to the Heritage Preservation Commission Hauran.

works
The most important of his books in history;

1-Papers in the culture and history of Yaman.(Arabic :أوراق في الثقافة والتاريخ اليماني).

2-Yemen's heritage to the contemporary.(Arabic :اليمن من التراث إلى المعاصرة).

3-Southern Syria Hauran.(Arabic :سورية الجنوبية (حوران)).

4-Glossary of cities and villages in the southern Levant (Syria).(Arabic :بلاد الشام الجنوبية سورية).

References
 libraries.najah
 discover-Syria
 daraa site
 books of, munir altheeb
 http://www.discover-syria.com/news/6820
 http://www.discover-syria.com/news/12925

Notes

1942 births
Syrian artists
20th-century Syrian historians
Syrian writers
Syrian people of Arab descent
Arab grammarians
Living people
Syrian scholars
21st-century Syrian historians